Tablelands, Queensland may refer to:

 Tablelands, Queensland (Gladstone Region), a locality in Queensland
 Tablelands, Queensland (South Burnett Region), a locality in Queensland
Electoral district of Tablelands, an electoral district in Queensland
Tablelands Region, a local government area in Queensland